Eileen Saki is an actress who was the final and longest-running actress to play Rosie, proprietor of Rosie's Bar in the television series M*A*S*H. She also had a small but memorable role in the season 5 premiere episode as the head 'Madam' of a coquettish group of prostitutes.

The switching of actresses in the role of Rosie mimics the actual handing over of the real-life 'Rosie's Bar' during the Korean War from mother to daughter. Alan Alda became aware of this when he received a letter from the real 'Rosie Jr.' about the incident in the early 1980s, a copy of which is available in the book The Last Days of M*A*S*H by Alan and Arlene Alda.

Filmography

External links
 

American television actresses
Living people
Year of birth missing (living people)
21st-century American women